The siege of Rhegium was fought in 387 BC between a Syracusan force and the city of Rhegium. The Syracusans were led by the tyrant Dionysius I. Dionysius took the city, and sold its inhabitants into slavery.

Rhegium had allied with Carthage against Syracuse during the Third Sicilian War because Syracuse was a rival in Magna Graecia and both wanted to control the Strait of Messina. Now that Syracuse and Carthage had secured peace, Dionysius wanted revenge on Rhegium. Dionysius invaded the mainland crushing Rhegium’s ally, the Italiote League of Taurentum, at the Battle of the Elleporus. He then besieged, captured and sacked Rhegium, selling its inhabitants into slavery. Rhegium would eventually be refounded by Dionysius II.

380s BC conflicts
Rhegium
387 BC
4th century BC in Italy